Juho Villehard Hakkinen (4 April 1872, Korpilahti - May 1918, Viipuri) was a Finnish blacksmith and politician. He was a member of the Parliament of Finland from 1916 to 1918, representing the Social Democratic Party of Finland (SDP). He sided with the Reds during the Finnish Civil War, was made prisoner and shot in May 1918.

References

1872 births
1918 deaths
People from Jyväskylä
People from Häme Province (Grand Duchy of Finland)
Social Democratic Party of Finland politicians
Members of the Parliament of Finland (1916–17)
Members of the Parliament of Finland (1917–19)
People of the Finnish Civil War (Red side)
People executed by Finland by firing squad
20th-century executions by Finland